Duoji Qiuyun (born 15 December 1962) is a Chinese archer. He competed in the men's individual and team events at the 1988 Summer Olympics.

References

1962 births
Living people
Chinese male archers
Olympic archers of China
Archers at the 1988 Summer Olympics
Place of birth missing (living people)
20th-century Chinese people